"Le vent nous portera" (translated as "The wind will carry us") is a song by French band Noir Désir from their 2001 album des Visages des Figures.
It was released as the first single from the album and reached number one for four weeks in a row in the Italian Singles Charts, as well as number three in the French charts and number seven in the Belgian Record Charts. French-born Spanish artist Manu Chao collaborated on the song and played guitar.

Music video

The music video was directed by Alexandre Courtes and Jacques Veneruso and featured Rebecca Hampton as the main character. It won Music Video of the Year in 2001.

Covers

The song has been covered by Belgian girls' choir Scala & Kolacny Brothers on their album Respire (2004), by Swiss singer Sophie Hunger on her album 1983 (2010), by German band Element of Crime on their album Fremde Federn (2010), by Les Charbonniers de l'enfer on their album Nouvelles fréquentations (2010), and Hungarian band Kistehén on the soundtrack for the film Kalandorok (2008). The Swedish-Hungarian singer Antonia Vai also performed a cover of this song live in 2016 on one of her concerts.

Trivia
It is the title song of the movie Q.

References

French songs
2001 singles
2001 songs